The Asia/Oceania Zone was one of the three regional zones of the 2019 Davis Cup.

Participating nations
<onlyinclude>

Seeds: 

Remaining nations:

Results summary

Results

Thailand vs. Philippines

Indonesia vs. New Zealand

Hong Kong vs. Chinese Taipei

References

External links

Asia/Oceania Zone Group II
Davis Cup Asia/Oceania Zone
Davis Cup Asia/Oceania Zone Group II
Davis Cup Asia/Oceania Zone Group II